Bill Bedenbaugh (born August 21, 1972) is an American football coach and former player. He is the current offensive line coach at the University of Oklahoma. He was the offensive line coach starting in 2013 and was promoted to co-OC prior to the 2017 season. Bedenbaugh is a spread offense offensive line coach from the Mike Leach coaching tree.

Coaching career

Early Coaching Career
Bedenbaugh began his coaching career as the offensive line coach at Oklahoma Panhandle State University in 1995. He lived in the dorms and made $150 a week.

Valdosta State
After that, he moved on to Valdosta State as the offensive line coach for the 1996 season.

Central Michigan
From there, Bedenbaugh joined the Central Michigan staff as a graduate assistant during the 1997 and 1998 seasons.

Ferris State
In 1999, Bedenbaugh was the offensive line coach and co-offensive coordinator at Ferris State in Michigan. In his lone season, he was named Footballscoop.com's division II Coordinator of the Year.

Texas Tech
Following his success at Ferris State, Bedenbaugh joined up with his college coach, Mike Leach, at Texas Tech as a graduate assistant. He spent 2000-2002 as a GA before being promoted to running backs coach for 2003 and 2004, and then 2005 and 2006 as offensive line coach.

Arizona
In 2007, Bedenbaugh joined Arizona as offensive line coach. In the last year of his four-year stint, he was promoted to co-offensive coordinator.

West Virginia
In 2011, Bedenbaugh was hired by his former Iowa Wesleyan teammate Dana Holgorsen as the offensive line coach for the West Virginia Mountaineers. He held this post for two seasons.

Oklahoma
Bob Stoops hired Bedenbaugh to be the offensive line coach at Oklahoma prior to the 2013 season. Following Stoops’ retirement, and Lincoln Riley’s subsequent promotion to head coach in the summer of 2017, Riley promoted Bedenbaugh to co-offensive coordinator.

Playing career
Bill Bedenbaugh was a four-year starter on the offensive line playing center at Iowa Wesleyan for head coach Hal Mumme and offensive coordinator Mike Leach. He played from 1991-1994.

Personal life
Bedenbaugh is a native of St. Charles, Illinois and is married to Maryde, who is from Tahlequah, Oklahoma. They met during Bedenbaugh's stint at Oklahoma Panhandle State.

References

External links
 Oklahoma profile

Living people
American football centers
Arizona Wildcats football coaches
Central Michigan Chippewas football coaches
Ferris State Bulldogs football coaches
Iowa Wesleyan Tigers football players
Oklahoma Panhandle State Aggies football coaches
Oklahoma Sooners football coaches
Texas Tech Red Raiders football coaches
Valdosta State Blazers football coaches
West Virginia Mountaineers football coaches
People from St. Charles, Illinois
1972 births